Bertoni is an Italian surname. Notable people with the surname include:

 Andrea Bertoni O.S.M. (1454–1483), Roman Catholic priest and saint patron of Faenza
 Angelo Bertoni (born 1933), member of the Queensland Legislative Assembly
Arnoldo de Winkelried Bertoni (1878–1973), Paraguayan zoologist
 Daniel Bertoni (born 1955), former Argentine footballer
 Ferdinando Bertoni (1725–1813), Italian composer and organist
 Flaminio Bertoni (1903–1964), automobile designer
 Francesca Bertoni (born 1993), talian female 3000 metres steeplechaser
 Gaspar Bertoni (1777–1853), Italian saint
 Letizia Bertoni (born 1937), former Italian hurdler
 Luca Bertoni (born 1992), Italian professional footballer 
 Luigi Bertoni (1872–1947), Italian-born anarchist writer and typographer
 Moisés Santiago Bertoni (1857–1929), botanist known for his studies on Stevia 
 Moises Bertoni Foundation, for the protection and sustainable development of natural resources in Paraguay
 Remo Bertoni (1909–1973), Italian professional road bicycle racer
 Remo Bertoni (footballer) (born 1929), Italian retired footballer and manager
 Sergio Bertoni (1915–1995), Italian football (soccer) player
 Xavier Bertoni (born 1988), French Freestyle skier

See also 
 15908 Bertoni, minor planet discovered by the Kitt Peak on October 2, 1997
 Bertoni's antbird, species of bird in the family Thamnophilidae
 GDE Bertoni, trophy and medal manufacturing company
 Bertoni's antbird : species of bird in the family Thamnophilidae
 Doctor Moisés Bertoni, village in the Caazapá department of Paraguay
 Bertone
  

Italian-language surnames